Korshunov (from коршун meaning kite (bird) is a Russian masculine surname, its feminine counterpart is Korshunova. It may refer to
Alexander Korshunov (born 1968), Transnistrian politician
Andrei Korshunov (born 1965), Russian equestrian
Ekaterina Korshunova (born 1988), Russian shooter
Inga Korshunova, Russian pair skater
Maksim Korshunov (born 1977), Russian swimmer
Maksim Korshunov (footballer) (born 1993), Russian football midfielder 
Nikolay Korshunov (born 1978), Russian musician and journalist
Ruslana Korshunova (1987–2008), Kazakhstani model of Russian descent
Sergei Korshunov (1928–1982), Soviet football player
Tatiana Korshunova (born 1956), Soviet sprint canoer 
Viktor Korshunov (1929–2015), Russian actor 
Vladislav Korshunov (born 1983), Russian rugby union player
Yuri Korshunov (1933–2002), Russian entomologist

See also
Egor Korshunov, a character in the 1997 movie Air Force One
Korsunov

Russian-language surnames